The sub-counties of Uganda are divided into parishes, which are further divided into villages.

See also
 Regions of Uganda
 Districts of Uganda
 Counties of Uganda
 Sub-counties of Uganda
 Uganda Local Governments Association

References

Subdivisions of Uganda
Uganda 5
Parishes, Uganda